Thorens is a formerly Swiss manufacturer of high-end audio equipment. Thorens is historically renowned for the range of phonographs (turntables) the manufacturer produces. In addition to audio playback equipment, Thorens is also a historical manufacturer of harmonicas and has been separately a producer of Swiss-made cigarette lighters, most notably the button actuated "automatic lighter".

History
In 1883, the Thorens family business was first registered in Sainte-Croix (Ste-Croix), Vaud, Switzerland by Hermann Thorens. An initial producer of musical boxes and clock movements (which they were still producing in the 1950s), they started producing Edison-type phonographs in 1903.

In 1928, they produced their first electric (motor-drive) record player, and went on to produce a range of audiophile record players in the 1950s and 1960s which are, even today, regarded as high-end audio equipment, and are much sought-after, for example, the belt-driven and sub-chassis suspended TD 150 which was presented 1965. Its principle is also found in the Linn Sondek LP12. Its successor TD 160 appeared in 1972 and was built nearly without discontinuity for 20 years. With the TD 320 Thorens presented in 1984 changed the springs of the sub-chassis to laminated springs.

Although Thorens embarked on a cost-reduction effort in 1997, the company became insolvent in 1999. A new Suisse Thorens Export Company AG took over the assets and continued trading. The owner of the rights to the name was Heinz Rohrer.

From 1999 the less expensive TD 190/170, later the TD 190/170-1, without sub-chassis was offered, its design is similar to the more expensive Thorens-players.

First 2004 Thorens presented a mass drive player the TD 850.
 
2012 Thorens got the EISA Award "best product 2011 / 2012" for the TD 309, a sub-chassis player with a three-point-suspension and a turntable made of glass.

In May 2018 Gunter Kürten, who had been manager at Denon- and Elac, became CEO and relocated operations to Germany.

As of 2019, Thorens continues to produce well-regarded turntables for the playback of vinyl and 78rpm gramophone records.

Gallery of record players

See also
 List of phonograph manufacturers

External links
 Official website
 The History of Thorens and free manuals to download
 The Thorens 'Excelda' portable gramophone: 360° rotatable view of a machine held at the British Library

References 

Phonograph manufacturers
Manufacturing companies established in 1883
Audio equipment manufacturers of Germany
Audio equipment manufacturers of Switzerland
Swiss brands